"O Sweet Saint Martin's Land", also known by its French title, "" ("Saint Martin, So Pretty"), is the bi-national song of Saint-Martin / Sint Maarten island, an island divided between the French Republic and the Kingdom of the Netherlands. It was written in English (the main language of Saint Martin) by Gerard Kemps in 1958. Kemps also wrote and composed a French version with its own lyrics and a different tune.

History 
After being appointed as priest for the Catholic Church of French St-Martin in 1954, Father Gerard Kemps felt compelled to compose lyrics and a melody about the beauty of the land of Saint Martin. In 1958, Kemps created "O Sweet Saint Martin's Land". Because of the message the lyrics conveyed and the melody that carried the tune, it served the purpose of a national song.

In 1984, on the occasion of the Dutch Queen's Birthday, Kemps was knighted in the Order of Orange-Nassau.

Although there are some now on St. Martin who are unaware of Kemps, his legacy lives on in the St. Martin's song.

A wide-hole 7-inch vinyl record (made in the Netherlands) was issued by Kemps & the Marigot Catholic Church choir.

Lyrics

English version

French version

Notes

References

External links
 .

North American anthems
National symbols of Sint Maarten
National symbols of the Collectivity of Saint Martin
Saint Martinois culture
1958 songs
French anthems
Dutch anthems